Fredonia Cemetery, also known as Holly Grove Cemetery and Stevens Creek Cemetery, is a cemetery in rural White County, Arkansas, northwest of Bald Knob on Fredonia Road.  The oldest portion of the cemetery houses marked graves with the oldest dating to 1870, and is estimated to contain at least 300 unmarked graves.  The cemetery houses many of the area's early settlers.

The historic portion of the cemetery was listed on the National Register of Historic Places in 2007.

See also
National Register of Historic Places listings in White County, Arkansas

References

Cemeteries on the National Register of Historic Places in Arkansas
Buildings and structures completed in 1839
National Register of Historic Places in White County, Arkansas
1839 establishments in Arkansas
Cemeteries established in the 1830s